Danish Journal of Archaeology, formerly the Journal of Danish Archaeology is an open-access peer-reviewed academic journal that was established in 1982. It is published by Routledge.

References 

Archaeology journals
Routledge academic journals
Open access journals
Publications established in 1982
English-language journals